Lake Five is a private fresh water lake in Kalkaska County, Michigan, United States.

Lake Five has abundant water fauna including largemouth bass, bluegill, perch, painted turtle and snapping turtle. Lake Five also has abundant land fauna including black bear, white-tailed deer, garter snake, midland brown snake (Storeria dekayi wrightorum), red fox, beaver and wild turkey.

See also

List of lakes in Michigan

References

Lakes of Kalkaska County, Michigan
Lakes of Michigan